Loré Ruth Lixenberg is a British mezzo-soprano, active in contemporary and experimental music.

She studied composition with Andy Vores, Robert Saxton and John Woolrich and attended masterclasses with Peter Maxwell Davies. She studied voice with Nicole Tibbels, David Mason, Elisabeth Soderstrom, Galina Vishnevskaya and Martin Isepp. Her experiments in voice extend to physical artworks, direction, and voice/theatre compositions that encompass film/physical theatre/new technologies and the theatre of objects.

Lixenberg co-directs the experimental artspace La Plaque Tournante with composer Frédéric Acquaviva in Berlin.
As a classically trained mezzo-soprano she has worked and performed the music of Georges Aperghis, Helmut Oehring, Frédéric Acquaviva, György Ligeti, Phill Niblock, Pauline Oliveros, Earle Brown, Karlheinz Stockhausen, Harrison Birtwistle, Beat Furrer, Maurice Lemaître, Mark-Anthony Turnage, Jocelyn Pook, Peter Maxwell Davies, György Kurtág, Denis Dufour, Bernard Heidsieck and Trevor Wishart as well as interpreted the works of Luciano Berio, Isidore Isou, Nam June Paik, Gil J. Wolman, Luigi Nono, Salvatore Sciarrino, Conlon Nancarrow, Cathy Berberian and John Cage, whose "Aria" she was the first to perform in Bayreuth and also to record the complete Song Books for the CD label Sub Rosa in 2012. She collaborates with experimental artists Stelarc, Bruce McLean, David Toop, Joan Key and works closely with the younger generation of composers Dai Fujikura, Laurence Osborn, Niels Ronsholdt. She also works with Neil Luck, Federico Reuben and Adam de la Cour and the musicians co-operative Squib-Box as well as with Apartment House.

Lixenberg gave over 1000 performances all around the globe, from The Royal Opera, Covent Garden, to the most underground venues and has performed with ensembles such as Ensemble InterContemporain, Wien Modern, Birmingham Contemporary Music Group, BBC Symphony Orchestra, Berlin Philharmonic, Tokyo Philharmonic, Suntory Hall, Tokyo.

She was active in the 1990s as a singer, actor, writer and comedian with Simon Munnery and Stewart Lee's Cluub Zarathustra and contributed to the BBC2 series Attention Scum. She created with composer Richard Thomas the BBC Two TV comedy opera series Kombat Opera Presents. She appeared in and helped develop Richard Thomas and Stewart Lee's musical, Jerry Springer: The Opera at Battersea Arts Centre, Edinburgh Festival, National Theatre and the Cambridge Theatre on London's West End. Lixenberg appeared in Out of a House walked a Man at the National Theatre and Miss Donnithorne's Maggot with Complicite. Currently resident director with Danish ensemble Scenatet, she directed the UK premiere of Mauricio Kagel's Staatstheater.

Her book Memory Maps (preface by David Toop) is in the collection of artists books held at Bibliothèque Kandinsky / Centre Pompidou, Paris, as well as her sound artwork Bird / Transformation section. Her first artwork CD The Afternoon of a phone is published by £@B in 2014 has been shown recently at Hamburger Bahnhof in Berlin.

In the 2019 United Kingdom general election she stood as an independent candidate in Hackney North and Stoke Newington, finishing last with 76 votes (0.1%).

Voice works 
Prêt a chanter (2015) – a realtime opera
Adipose – A Cautionary Tale (2013) – a live art opera
Panic Room – The Singterviews (2012) – a realtime opera
Bird (2010) – an avian opera
Lethe (2008)  – a grief opera
The Little Christmas Tree (2006) – an installation opera

References

External links

Living people
Experimental composers
British performance artists
British mezzo-sopranos
Avant-garde singers
British women composers
Year of birth missing (living people)
Place of birth missing (living people)
20th-century British women singers
20th-century women composers
21st-century British women singers
Independent British political candidates